For Men is an Italian monthly men's magazine devoted to sex, health, nutrition, hobby, sport and other men's issues published in Milan, Italy.

History and profile
For Men was established in 2003. The magazine is published on a monthly basis in Milan by the publishing company Cairo Editore. On the cover has appeared celebrities like Edoardo Costa, Gonzalo Canale, Alessandro Petacchi, Stefano Tempesti, Vin Diesel, Antonio Rossi, Jury Chechi, Tom Cruise and Filippo Magnini.

Calendars
Over the years, For Men has made some annual sexy calendars of female nude: each calendar is published in the month of November of the previous year compared with the RCY (referring calendar year). In some years For Men has made 2 different calendars. Taylor Mega donated to charity all her remuneration received for the 2020 For Men calendar.

See also
 List of magazines in Italy

References

External links
For Men Official Website

2003 establishments in Italy
Italian-language magazines
Magazines published in Milan
Magazines established in 2003
Men's magazines
Monthly magazines published in Italy